Frank Jenks (November 4, 1902 – May 13, 1962) was an acid-voiced American supporting actor of stage and films.

Biography

Early years
Jenks was born in Des Moines, Iowa, and his mother gave him a trombone when he was 9 years old. By his late teens he was playing with Eddie Peabody and his band. Later, he became a studio musician in Hollywood, California.

Movie career
Jenks began in vaudeville and went on to a long career in movies and television, mostly in comedy. He was one of the more familiar faces and voices of the Hollywood Studio era. For almost ten years beginning in the early 1920s, Jenks was a song and dance man in vaudeville.

In 1933, when sound films had become the norm, and Broadway actors were moving to Hollywood in droves, Jenks's flat, sarcastic delivery landed him a film career. Usually a supporting actor, Jenks did appear occasionally as a film lead for low-budget films for PRC. Jenks appeared in not a few classics. In the Cary Grant-Rosalind Russell classic His Girl Friday (1940), Jenks had his most famous role, as the cynical newsman "Wilson." When television began, Jenks made a successful transition.

Jenks' biggest continuing role was that of Uthas P. Garvey, the skeptical, proletarian right-hand man for the loquacious English conman Colonel Humphrey Flack (1953-1954), in the DuMont TV series of that name. He reprised the role in a syndicated version of Colonel Humphrey Flack that was syndicated in 1958.

Jenks portrayed Lieutenant Rodney in the DuMont series Front Page Detective (1951-1952), and he was a member of the cast of The Eddie Cantor Comedy Theater, which was syndicated in 1955.

Death
On May  13, 1962, Jenks died of cancer in Hollywood, California, at age 59.

Selected filmography

 Luxury Liner (1933) - Ship's Bandleader (uncredited)
 Hello, Everybody! (1933) - Orchestra Leader (uncredited)
 College Humor (1933) - Orchestra Leader (uncredited)
 Broadway to Hollywood (1933) - Call Boy (uncredited)
 Young and Beautiful (1934) - Cheer Leader (uncredited)
 College Rhythm (1934) - Orchestra Leader (uncredited)
 Follow the Fleet (1936) - Sailor (uncredited)
 The Farmer in the Dell (1936) - Bill Crosby
 The Witness Chair (1936) - Roy Levino
 The Last Outlaw (1936) - Deputy Tom
 Women Are Trouble (1936) - Reporter (uncredited)
 Swing Time (1936) - Red - Dancer (uncredited)
 Walking on Air (1936) - First Gas Station Attendant (uncredited)
 Don't Turn 'Em Loose (1936) - Pete - Henchman
 Old Hutch (1936) - Crook #2 (uncredited)
 The Big Broadcast of 1937 (1936) - Trombone Player
 Smartest Girl in Town (1936) - Mr. Murphy - Photographer (uncredited)
 That Girl from Paris (1936) - Laughing Boy Frank
 The Charge of the Light Brigade (1936)
 We Who Are About to Die (1937) - Clyde Beasley
 When's Your Birthday? (1937) - Lefty
 There Goes My Girl (1937) - Reporter Frank 'George' Tate
 Angel's Holiday (1937) - Butch Broder
 One Hundred Men and a Girl (1937) - Taxi Driver
 The Lady Fights Back (1937) - Steve (scenes deleted)
 Saturday's Heroes (1937) - Dubrowsky
 The Westland Case (1937) - Doc Williams
 Prescription for Romance (1937) - Smitty
 You're a Sweetheart (1937) - Harry Howe
 Love Is a Headache (1938) - Joe Cannon
 Reckless Living (1938) - Freddie
 Goodbye Broadway (1938) - Harry Clark
 The Lady in the Morgue (1938) - Doc Williams
 The Devil's Party (1938) - Sam
 Letter of Introduction (1938) - Joe - Theater Prompter
 Youth Takes a Fling (1938) - Frank Munson
 The Storm (1938) - Peter Carey - Wireless Operator
 Strange Faces (1938) - Nick Denby
 The Last Warning (1938) - Doc Williams
 You Can't Cheat an Honest Man (1939) - Jerry - Assistant (uncredited)
 Society Smugglers (1939) - Emery
 Big Town Czar (1939) - Sid Travers
 S.O.S. Tidal Wave (1939) - Peaches Jackson
 The Under-Pup (1939) - Uncle Dan
 Golden Boy (1939) - Pepper White (uncredited)
 First Love (1939) - Mike the Cop
 His Girl Friday (1940) - Wilson
 Three Cheers for the Irish (1940) - Ed McKean
 A Little Bit of Heaven (1940) - Uncle Dan
 Melody and Moonlight (1940) - Butch Reilly
 Dancing on a Dime (1940) - Phil Miller
 Tall, Dark and Handsome (1941) - Puffy
 Back Street (1941) - Harry Niles
 The Flame of New Orleans (1941) - 2nd Sailor
 Scattergood Meets Broadway (1941) - J. J. Bent
 Two Yanks in Trinidad (1942) - Joe Scavenger
 Syncopation (1942) - Smiley Jackson
 Maisie Gets Her Man (1942) - Art Giffman
 The Navy Comes Through (1942) - Sampier
 Seven Miles from Alcatraz (1942) - Jimbo
 The Human Comedy (1943) - Larry - Song Leader on Train (uncredited)
 Corregidor (1943) - Sgt. Mahoney
 Shantytown (1943) - 'Whitey'
 Gildersleeve's Bad Day (1943) - Al
 So's Your Uncle (1943) - Joe Elliott
 Thousands Cheer (1943) - Sgt. Koslack
 Hi'ya, Sailor (1943) - Deadpan Weaver
 His Butler's Sister (1943) - Emmett
 Ladies Courageous (1944) - Snapper
 Rosie the Riveter (1944) - Kelly Kennedy
 Shake Hands with Murder (1944) - Eddie Jones
 Follow the Boys (1944) - Chick Doyle (uncredited)
 Two Girls and a Sailor (1944) - Dick Deyo (uncredited)
 This Is the Life (1944) - Eddie
 Roger Touhy, Gangster (1944) - Bernard 'Troubles' O'Connor
 Take It or Leave It (1944) - Taxi Driver (uncredited)
 Three Little Sisters (1944) - Pvt. 'Rosy' Rowman
 Dixie Jamboree (1944) - Jack 'Curly' Berger
 The Impatient Years (1944) - Top Sergeant (uncredited)
 Strange Affair (1944) - Sgt. Erwin
 Rogues' Gallery (1944) - Eddie Porter
 The Falcon in Hollywood (1944) - Lieutenant Higgins
 The Kid Sister (1945) - Burglar
 G.I. Honeymoon (1945) - Horace P. 'Blubber' Malloy
 Zombies on Broadway (1945) - Gus
 The Phantom of 42nd Street (1945) - Egbert Egelhofer, aka Romeo (Taxicab Driver)
 The Missing Corpse (1945) - Mack Hogan
 Bedside Manner (1945) - Pvt. Harry Smith
 Steppin' in Society (1945) - George
 Christmas in Connecticut (1945) - Sinkewicz
 One Way to Love (1946) - Jensen
 The Hoodlum Saint (1946) - Dance Contest M.C. (uncredited)
 Blondie's Lucky Day (1946) - Mailman
 White Tie and Tails (1946) - George
 That Brennan Girl (1946) - Joe the Cabbie
 Philo Vance's Gamble (1947) - Ernie Clark
 That's My Gal (1947) - Louie Koblentz
 Kilroy Was Here (1947) - Butch Miller
 Philo Vance's Secret Mission (1947) - Ernie Clark
 Blonde Savage (1947) - Hoppy Owens
 High Wall (1947) - Pinky (uncredited)
 Mary Lou (1948) - Mike Connors
 Mr. Reckless (1948) - Cab Driver
 Blondie's Reward (1948) - Ed Vance
 Joe Palooka in Winner Take All (1948) - Louie
 You Gotta Stay Happy (1948) - Carnival Man
 Shep Comes Home (1948) - The Iceman
 Family Honeymoon (1948) - Gas Station Attendant
 Prison Warden (1949) - Postman (uncredited)
 Mother Didn't Tell Me (1950) - Furniture Mover (uncredited)
 Blondie's Hero (1950) - Tim Saunders
 Motor Patrol (1950) - Mac
 Lucky Losers (1950) - Bartender
 The Petty Girl (1950) - Kaye - Producer #2 (uncredited)
 Woman on the Run (1950) - Detective Shaw
 To Please a Lady (1950) - Press Agent
 Joe Palooka in the Squared Circle (1950) - Looie - a Trainer
 Bowery Battalion (1951) - Recruiting Sergeant
 Silver City Bonanza (1951) - Theater Owner
 The Scarf (1951) - Tom (uncredited)
 I Was an American Spy (1951) - Radio Operator 'Mac' Marconi (uncredited)
 Father Takes the Air (1951) - Customer (uncredited)
 Let's Go Navy! (1951) - Shell game sailor
 Utah Wagon Train (1951) - Hap - Telephone Company Lineman
 Pecos River (1951) - Sheriff Denning
 Mr. Walkie Talkie (1952) - Corporal Jackson
 White Lightning (1953) - Benny Brown
 Highway Dragnet (1954) - Marine in Civvies
 Outlaw Treasure (1955) - Sergeant
 Not as a Stranger (1955) - Mr. Parrish (uncredited)
 Tennessee's Partner (1955) - Bartender (uncredited)
 Artists and Models (1955) - Piano-Mover (uncredited)
 Sudden Danger (1955) - Kenny - Bartender
 Dig That Uranium (1955) - Olaf the Mechanic (uncredited)
 Slightly Scarlet (1956) - Bartender (uncredited)
 The Houston Story (1956) - Louie Phelan
 The She-Creature (1956) - Plainclothes Sgt. with Lt. James
 Friendly Persuasion (1956) - Shell Game Man (uncredited)
 Shake, Rattle & Rock! (1956) - Frank
 The Amazing Colossal Man (1957) - Truck Driver
 Merry Andrew (1958) - Bertie (uncredited)
 Rock-A-Bye Baby (1958) - Reporter (uncredited)

References

External links

1902 births
1962 deaths
American male film actors
Deaths from cancer in California
Deaths from esophageal cancer
Male actors from Des Moines, Iowa
Vaudeville performers
20th-century American male actors